John Ronald Tovey was a British cyclist from the South West UK. He raced for Bath Cycling Club in the early 1960s and also Gordano Valley CC. He was noted for racing the first production ‘Moulton’ cycles and was televised by ITN in 1962, racing a Moulton Special. He took part in the original Cardiff to London 162 mile Time trials and, with others, broke the speed record for that event with the fastest time being achieved by John Woodburn of Reading (6hrs and 44 minutes). Tovey worked for Alex Moulton in the early 60s and was part of the Moulton eight.

Moulton eight

Initially, apart from Moulton, seven people were responsible for the production of this challenge. Technical manager Phil Uncles, who contributed largely to the design; Brian Cottrell (Bath), whose drawings helped accelerate the experiments; Bert Hervin, whose produced special tubes out of sheet metal; tester Graham Cottle; newcomer Michael Bainton; and John Tovey. Moulton produced six models: The Standard, De-Luxe, Safari, Speed, Stowaway and Speedsix. There was also a special 'S' range produced at a separate building over the river at Bradford-on-Avon.

In 1970 a Mk3 high performance prototype named the Moulton Marathon was commissioned and was hand built by Tovey at the Moulton Bradford on Avon works. This bike was used by Colin Martin on his cycling trip from England to Kalgoorlie, Western Australia, in the same year. Colin Martin’s book Half way round also makes reference to Tovey.

References

 Wiltshire Times 9 November 1962
 Evening Post November 1962.
 Half Way Round - Book publication by Peter Knottley 1971
 ITN Archives
 www.britishpathe.com/
 YouTube

(http://backup.britishpathe.com/record.php?id=1492)
(http://www.moultonbicycles.co.uk/news.html)
(https://www.youtube.com/watch?v=Pb5e46nDg5Y)

English male cyclists
Place of birth missing (living people)
Living people
Year of birth missing (living people)